General elections were held in Montserrat on 8 October 1991. The result was a victory for the National Progressive Party (NPP), which won four of the seven seats in the Legislative Council. NPP leader Reuben Meade became Chief Minister.

Background
The People's Liberation Movement (PLM) had won the 1987 elections, taking four of the seven seats in the Legislative Council. However, Minister of Communications Benjamin Chalmers left the party over corruption allegations, meaning it lost its majority. As a result, early elections were called.

Campaign
A total of 26 candidates contested the elections, more than ever before. The NPP nominated seven candidates, the National Development Party six, and the PLM four. The remaining nine candidates ran as independents.

Results

References

Elections in Montserrat
Montserrat
1991 in Montserrat
1991 elections in British Overseas Territories
October 1991 events in North America